Argyle House School is an independent school in North East England. It was founded in 1884. Though not in the original location, it is still located in the same area, Thornhill, and borders Ashbrooke, about five minutes' walk away from Sunderland city centre. It caters for pupils from age 2 to 16, and at the time of the last inspection in 2018, had 122 boys and 118 girls in attendance.

The Headmaster is Christopher Johnson.

History 
Founded by G.L. Hanna in 1884 in nearby Argyle Square, from which it got its name, it remained in the Hanna family until 1969 until it was sold to the current proprietor's father, Jeffrey Johnson. The current Headmaster purchased the school from his father on the latter's retirement in 2003 
The school, founded as a boys' school, has been non-selective and co-educational since 2099
.

References

External links 
Argyle House School Official Site
ISI Inspection Report

Private schools in the City of Sunderland
Sunderland